Wenying ( 11th century), courtesy name Daowen, was a Song dynasty Buddhist monk who authored the unofficial history books Xiangshan Yelu and Yuhu Qinghua.

Biography
Wenying was a native of Qiantang (錢塘, modern Hangzhou), Hang Prefecture, Liangzhe Circuit of the Song Empire. He was a talented poet who studied under Ding Wei and received Ding's favors. He also befriended Su Shunqing who introduced him to Ouyang Xiu. He later lived in the Jinluan Monastery (金鑾寺) in Jing Prefecture in modern Hubei.

Wenying was fascinated by public affairs, and by the 1070s he had collected works by more than 200 writers since the dynasty began in 960. This collection, numbering thousands of chapters, included biographies, memorials to the throne, official historical records, obituaries inscribed on tombs, and religious texts from steles, as well as poems and private prose literature.

Bibliography
Xiangshan Yelu (湘山野錄), completed in the Xining era (1068–1077)
Yuhu Qinghua (玉壺清話), completed in 1078

Both history books focus on saints, emperors, and ministers from the early Song dynasty, but Wenying also included anecdotes he heard and saw. Wenying expressed his views openly, including criticisms of court officials. Yuhu Qingshi also includes 2 chapters on the Southern Tang dynasty (937–976).

References

11th-century Chinese historians
Writers from Hangzhou
Historians from Zhejiang
Song dynasty historians
Song dynasty Buddhists